The 1951 National Football League Draft was held January 18–19, 1951, at the Blackstone Hotel in Chicago. The Baltimore Colts folded after the 1950 season, and the NFL placed their players in the 1951 NFL draft.

This was the fifth year that the first overall pick was a bonus pick determined by lottery, with the previous four winners (Chicago Bears in 1947, Washington Redskins in 1948, Philadelphia Eagles in 1949, and Detroit Lions in 1950) ineligible from the draw; it was won by the New York Giants, who selected halfback Kyle Rote.

Player selections

Round one

 HOF Member of the Professional Football Hall of Fame

Round two

Round three

Round four

Round five

Round six

Round seven

Round eight

Round nine

Round ten

Round eleven

Round twelve

Round thirteen

Round fourteen

Round fifteen

Round sixteen

Round seventeen

Round eighteen

Round nineteen

Round twenty

Round twenty-one

Round twenty-two

Round twenty-three

Round twenty-four

Round twenty-five

Round twenty-six

Round twenty-seven

Round twenty-eight

Round twenty-nine

Round thirty

Hall of Famers
 Jack Christiansen, defensive back from Colorado State University taken 6th round 69th pick by the Detroit Lions.
Inducted: Professional Football Hall of Fame class of 1970.
 Y. A. Tittle, quarterback from LSU taken 1st round 3rd overall by the San Francisco 49ers.
Inducted: Professional Football Hall of Fame class of 1971.
 Andy Robustelli, defensive end from the University of Bridgeport Taken in the 19th round 228th overall by the Los Angeles Rams.
Inducted: Professional Football Hall of Fame class of 1971.
 Bill George, linebacker from Wake Forest University taken 2nd round 23rd overall by the Chicago Bears.
Inducted: Professional Football Hall of Fame class of 1974.
 Mike McCormack, offensive tackle from the University of Kansas taken 3rd round 34th overall by the New York Yanks.
Inducted: Professional Football Hall of Fame class of 1984.
 Don Shula, back from John Carroll University taken 9th round 110th overall by the Cleveland Browns.
Inducted: Professional Football Hall of Fame class of 1997 as a coach, not a player.
 Jack Butler, cornerback from St.Bonaventure undrafted by the Pittsburgh Steelers.
Inducted: Professional Football Hall of Fame class of 2012.
 Dick Stanfel, guard from San Francisco taken 2nd round 19th overall by the Detroit Lions.
Inducted: Professional Football Hall of Fame class of 2016.

Notable undrafted players

References

External links
 NFL.com – 1951 Draft
 databaseFootball.com – 1951 Draft
 Pro Football Hall of Fame

National Football League Draft
Draft
NFL Draft
NFL Draft
1950s in Chicago
American football in Chicago
Events in Chicago